Daman: A Victim of Marital Violence is a 2001 Indian drama film directed by Kalpana Lajmi released on 4 May 2001. The lead actress, Raveena Tandon, won the distinguished National Film Award for Best Actress for her role as Durga Saikia. The film follows the story of a battered wife. The film was distributed by the Indian Government. It marked the debut of bollywood singer Shaan, son of singer and composer Late Manas Mukherjee and younger brother of pop singer and actress Sagarika.

Plot 
The Saikia family are an extremely wealthy family in Assam. The two sons of the family are Sanjay (Sayaji Shinde) and Sunil Saikia (Sanjay Suri). The latter being the kinder of the two whilst the former is very hot-tempered and has occasional mood swings. The parents decide to get him married to Durga (Raveena Tandon), a lower caste girl from a poor family, thinking she will be able to cope with Sanjay's temper. Sanjay initially refuses to marry Durga, but when his mother threatens to cut him off from the family will he relents. Thus, Durga marries Sanjay and looks forward to her new life. From day one, Durga is subjected to physical and mental harm by her husband. To add insult to injury, he spends their wedding night with a sex worker called Chameli. Durga continues to be tortured by her husband and after a drunken night he rapes her.

Soon Durga is pregnant, but Sanjay is convinced the child is not his but Sunil's. Durga gives birth to a girl, named Deepa, but this only disappoints Sanjay and he shuns the child. Sanjay decides to get Deepa, now twelve years old, married to a much older man. When Durga protests, he viciously beats her. Durga's only companion Sunil is killed by Sanjay after he suspects that he and Durga were having an affair. Durga is devastated by Sunil's death and decides that enough is enough. She runs away with Deepa and decides to cut all ties with Sanjay. Sanjay files a police complaint but is unsuccessful in finding the two. Durga carries on with her life but it's not long before Sanjay finds the two. Eventually Durga kills her husband.

Cast
Raveena Tandon as Durga Saikia
Sayaji Shinde as Sanjay Saikia
Sanjay Suri as Sunil Saikia
Raima Sen as Deepa Saikia
Nipon Goswami
Bharti Jaffrey
Indra Bania
Moloya Goswami
Shaan as Kaushik Nath

Music
"Gum Sum Nisha Aayi (Female)" - Kavita Krishnamurthy
"Jai Bhagawathi" - Jaspinder Narula
"Gum Sum Nisha Aayi" - Bhupen Hazarika
"Hu Hu Pagal" - Kavita Krishnamurthy, Bhupen Hazarika
"Sun Sun Goriya Kya Bole Teraa Kangana" - Alka Yagnik
"Sar Sar Hawa, Jisne Badan Chhua Hai" - Hema Sardesai
"Bahar Hi Bahar Hai, Fiza Me Bhi Khumar Hai" - Shaan, Dominique Cerejo

References

External links

2001 films
2000s Hindi-language films
Films shot in Assam
Films shot in Mumbai
Films featuring a Best Actress National Award-winning performance
Films about women in India
Films about domestic violence
Non-Assamese-language films with Assamese connection
Films scored by Bhupen Hazarika
Films directed by Kalpana Lajmi